WTMY is an AM radio station in Southwest Florida broadcasting a regional Mexican format at 1280 AM. WTMY is not licensed for HD (hybrid digital) operation.

Licensed to Sarasota, Florida, United States, the station is owned and operated by Tomas Martinez and Mercedes Soler, through licensee Solmart Media, LLC.

History
The station signed on in December 1960 as WYND, operated by Kelsey Hutchinson of Gulf Coast Broadcasting. On November 1, 1966 it switched to a top 40 format called Surf Row Radio. It has had different call letters over the years, including WWZZ and WSGX. As WSGX, the station was broadcasting in AM Stereo. In 2011, the station became a Fox Sports affiliate.

In October 2013, the station changed its format to big bands and American standards. On-air staff are Eugene Dolan, Doug Miles, Smilin' Lou Powers, with shows such as "Big Band Wakeup Call", "Sunshine Music Memories with Smilin' Lou Powers", "Big Band Files with Doug Miles", "Sounds of Sinatra" with Sid Mark, "Milkman's Serenade" with Eugene Dolan, "Those Were the Days" with Danny Lane, "Swing Street" with Kevin Hayes, Artist Spotlight with Doug Miles, contributor Don Henderson, "Your Hit Parade" with Bea Wain and Andre Baruch, and Old Time Radio Classics with Will Rogers. Betty Comora was Creative Director.

"Artist Spotlight with Doug Miles" guests include: Cynthia Sayer, Liz Callaway, Dick Hyman, Patti LuPone, Steve Lawrence, John O’Hurley, Jack Jones, Sandy Stewart, Judy Carmichael, Linda Purl, Sid Mark, Audrey Landers, Deana Martin, Larry Kane, Mark Russell, Stephanie Trick, Kitt Moran, Julie Budd, Ann Hampton Callaway, Dennis Bono, Michael Feinstein, Sarasota Jazz Project Big Band, Ken Loomer Big Band, and Ocean's Eleven Big Band.

On August 8, 2016, the station was sold by Southwest Florida Radio Broadcasting LLC to Solmart Media for $125,000, and the format was changed to Spanish language programming, simulcasting then-sister station WZZS in Zolfo Springs, Florida.

The AM transmitter is located on City Island near Longboat Key in Sarasota, Florida.

On April 4, 2019, the station added an FM translator on 99.1 at the intersection of Honore Avenur and Fruitville Road.

References

External links

Doug Miles

TMY
1960 establishments in Florida
Radio stations established in 1960